Antabia "Tay" Waller (born July 11, 1988) is an American professional basketball player for Igokea of the Bosnian League and the Adriatic League.

References

External links
Euro Basket by Sports I.T. accessed September 9, 2016 
Basketball.RealGM.com accessed September 9, 2016 
FIBA.com International Basketball accessed September 9, 2016 

1988 births
Living people
ABA League players
American expatriate basketball people in Bosnia and Herzegovina
American expatriate basketball people in Italy
American expatriate basketball people in Kosovo
American expatriate basketball people in Montenegro
American expatriate basketball people in Turkey
American men's basketball players
Auburn Tigers men's basketball players
Bashkimi Prizren players
Basketball players from Georgia (U.S. state)
Gaziantep Basketbol players
KB Prishtina players
KK Igokea players
KK Mornar Bar players
Lega Basket Serie A players
Northwest Florida State Raiders men's basketball players
Oyak Renault basketball players
Pallacanestro Varese players
People from Manchester, Georgia
Point guards
Sportspeople from the Atlanta metropolitan area